Golon Mihran (from Middle Iranian Gōrgōn), also known as Mihran Mihrevandak, was a Sasanian spahbed, and also the marzban of Persian Armenia from 572 to 574. Golon was mentioned by Sebeos as an Sasanian commander in Armenia. He was also a member of the House of Mihran.

Biography
In 572, Vardan III Mamikonian revolted against the marzban Chihor-Vishnasp and killed him. Khosrau I then sent Golon Mihran at the head of an army of twenty thousand men to recapture Armenia, but the latter was defeated in Taron by Vardan Mamikonian, who captured his war elephants as war booty. After his defeat, he advanced towards Caucasian Iberia, where he was once again defeated.

He then invaded Southern Armenia at the head of another army of twenty thousand men along with some war elephants with "the order to exterminate the population of Armenia, to destroy, to kill, to raze the land without mercy." He captured the city of Angl in Bagrevand, what happened after is unknown.

Descendants
Bahram Chobin, the famous Mihranid spahbed and briefly shahanshah, claimed to be the grandson of Golon Mihran.

References

Sources

 

6th-century Iranian people
Sasanian governors of Armenia
Year of birth unknown
House of Mihran
Spahbeds
Generals of Khosrow I